Kobzarstvo in the wider definition, is the art and related culture of singing to the accompaniment of the Ukrainian plucked string instruments bandura and kobza, as well as the Ukrainian hurdy-gurdy, which is called lira.

More specifically, it deals with the related culture of the blind professional itinerant folk singers, known as the kobzars and the lirnyks. It includes their musical genres, style of performing, playing techniques, customs, secret language (known as Lebiy), organization and para-religious traditions.

The study of kobzarstvo initially started in the mid-18th century and continues to this day.

The wider definition, although not accurate, it can also include the culture of the more modern non-blind conservatory trained musicians and bandura ensembles - both amateur and professional.

See also
Preservation of kobzar music

References
 Diakowsky, M. - A Note on the History of the Bandura. The Annals of the Ukrainian Academy of Arts and Sciences in the U.S. - 4, 3-4 №1419, N.Y. 1958 - С.21-22
 Diakowsky, M. J. - The Bandura. The Ukrainian Trend, 1958, №I,  - С.18-36
 Diakowsky, M. – Anyone can make a bandura – I did.  The Ukrainian Trend, Volume 6
 Haydamaka, L. – Kobza-bandura – National Ukrainian Musical Instrument. "Guitar Review" №33, Summer 1970 (С.13-18)
 Hornjatkevyč, A. – The book of Kodnia and the three Bandurists.  Bandura, #11-12, 1985
 Hornjatkevyč A. J., Nichols T. R. - The Bandura.  Canada crafts, April-May, 1979 p. 28-29
 Mishalow, V. - A Brief Description of the Zinkiv Method of Bandura Playing. Bandura, 1982, №2/6, - С.23-26
 Mishalow, V.  - The Kharkiv style #1. Bandura 1982, №6, - С.15-22 #2 – Bandura 1985, №13-14, - С.20-23 #3 – Bandura 1988, №23-24, - С.31-34 #4 – Bandura 1987, №19-20, - С.31-34 #5 – Bandura 1987, №21-22, - С.34-35
 Mishalow, V. - A Short History of the Bandura. East European Meetings in Ethnomusicology 1999, Romanian Society for Ethnomusicology, Volume 6, - С.69-86
 Mizynec, V. - Folk Instruments of Ukraine. Bayda Books, Melbourne, Australia, 1987 - 48с.
 Cherkaskyi, L. - Ukrainski narodni muzychni instrumenty. Tekhnika, Kyiv, Ukraine, 2003 - 262 pages.